The Holden Commodore (VB) is a mid-size car that was produced by Holden, from 1978 to 1980. It was the first iteration of the first generation of the Holden Commodore.

The car was officially launched on 26 October 1978 with showrooms receiving the first examples on 13 November 1978. Production of the VB only lasted seventeen months, the shortest reign of any Commodore. The VB Commodore was effectively the successor of the Holden HZ, although most models in that series continued to be produced until the introduction of the facelifted VC Commodore on 30 March 1980.

95,906 units of the VB Commodore were manufactured during the car's lifespan, and during 1979 the VB became Australia's number one selling car. Also in 1979, the VB won Wheels Car of the Year award, with the car being praised in the media for its value for money and engineering sophistication.

Design 
The VB Commodore was loosely based on the 1977 Opel Rekord E bodyshell but with the front grafted on from the Opel Senator to accommodate the larger Holden six-cylinder and V8 engines, giving it a similar appearance to the Opel Commodore, the Vauxhall Viceroy, sold in the UK and the Chevrolet Commodore, sold in South Africa. Overall, the body was strengthened substantially to withstand the harsh conditions of the Australian outback. Total cost of development is reported to be over A$110 million.

The Commodore represented a major shift in thinking for Holden since it was significantly smaller than the previous full-size family car, the Holden Kingswood, but visually similar in size to the mid-size Torana / Sunbird sedans. It essentially came about in response to the 1973 oil crisis and the need to produce more fuel-efficient cars. Holden, hedging their bets, initially built the Commodore alongside the other two established body styles, until the Torana was dropped in mid-1979, with only the Sunbird surviving into mid-1980 following release of the updated VC Commodore. The VB was available in three specification levels: Commodore, Commodore SL, and Commodore SL/E. A station wagon variant – not available in SL/E form – was released on 24 July 1979, hitting showrooms on 6 August 1979. It featured a large cargo area and an easy access one-piece lift-up tailgate. As the wagon-specific sheet metal had to be imported from Germany (from the Rekord), the wagon suffered from inevitable component differences from the sedan, confirmed by the separate keys for the ignition system and rear door.

The OHV engines were largely carried over from the Kingswood: a 2.85-litre 64-kilowatt (86 hp) straight-six, 3.3-litre 71-kilowatt (96 hp) straight-six, 4.2-litre 87-kilowatt (117 hp) V8, which was also available with dual exhausts to produce 96 kilowatts (129 hp) of power, and a 5.0-litre 114-kilowatt (153 hp) V8, which in dual exhaust form was rated at 125 kilowatts (168 hp). The engine blocks on these motors were painted red and are therefore commonly referred to as the Red motors. The VB was also available with either a four-speed manual transmission or a three-speed Trimatic automatic transmission, or the Turbo-Hydramatic 350/400 automatic transmission with the 5.0-litre V8.

Specification levels 

All V8's came with power steering. On the station wagon, there was no 15x6 inch alloy wheels option.

Commodore 
The Commodore was the baseline variant, and was available as a sedan or station wagon. The sedan was priced from A$6,513.

The VB Commodore standard features included:
 2.85-litre  Red I6 engine
 4-speed manual transmission
 Featured body colour tail panel
 Silver finish on instrument surrounds
 Vinyl trim
 Steel wheels

The VB Commodore standard optional included:
 3.3-litre 66-kilowatt (89 hp) Red I6 engine
 4.2-litre 87-kilowatt (117 hp) Red V8 engine
 3-speed automatic transmission
 Air conditioning
 Corded cloth interior
 Power steering
 European Pack which incorporated:
 3.3-litre 66-kilowatt (89 hp) Red I6 engine
 Full instrumentation
 Four wheel discs
 Headlight washers / wipers
 15 inch alloy wheels
 Sport Pack on manuals only, which incorporated:
 4.2-litre 87-kilowatt (117 hp) Red V8 engine
 Full instrumentation
 Four wheel discs brakes
 Headlight washers/wipers
 15x6 inch alloy wheels

Commodore SL 
The Commodore SL was the mid-spec variant, and was available as a sedan or station wagon. The sedan was priced from A$7,813.

The VB Commodore SL standard features included:
 3.3-litre  Red I6 engine
 3-speed automatic transmission
 Bright door mouldings
 Chrome wheeltrim rings
 Corded velour cloth trim
 Extra gauges (volts & oil pressure)
 Featured vertical accent bars on the grille
 Inertia reel seatbelts for the outer rear passengers
 Rear centre armrest
 Rosewood dash finish
 Silver tail panel
 Twin exterior mirrors
 Variable intermittent speed wipers
 Steel wheels

The VB Commodore SL optional features included:
 4.2-litre  Red V8 engine
 Air conditioning
 Power steering
 Full instrumentation
 Four wheel discs brakes
 Headlight washers/wipers
 4-speed manual transmission
 Vinyl upholstery
 15x6 inch alloy wheels

Commodore SL/E 

The Commodore SL/E was the top-of-the-line variant. It was available as a sedan only, and was priced from A$10,513.

The VB Commodore SL/E standard features included:
 4.2-litre 87-kilowatt (117 hp) Red V8 engine
 3-speed automatic transmission
 Air conditioning
 Black door frames and tail panel
 Blacked out grille
 Burr walnut dash
 Chrome exhaust
 Chrome door handles
 Extended rear bumpers
 Blaupunkt stereo radio cassette player
 Electric aerial
 Headlight wiper/washers
 Power steering
 Reading lights
 Retractable seatbelts
 Reversing mirror
 Tachometer
 Velour trim and cut pile carpet
 4 wheels disc brakes
 15x6 inch alloy wheels

The VB Commodore SL/E optional features included:
 3.3 L 71-kilowatt (89 hp) Red I6 engine available as a reduced cost option
 5.0 L 114-kilowatt (153 hp) Red V8 engine which incorporated:
 Turbo-Hydramatic 350 or 400 transmission
 4-speed manual transmission
 Central locking
 Power windows

Motorsport 
The VB Commodore featured heavily in Australian motorsport in the latter part of 1979 and through most of 1980.

In 1979 the factory backed Holden Dealer Team entered a three-car VB Commodore team in the  Repco Round Australia Trial which started and finished at the Royal Melbourne Showgrounds and travelled clockwise around the country over some of the most inhospitable terrain imaginable. The team Commodore's were powered by the 3.3-litre straight-six Holden Red motor rather than the more powerful V8 due to their much lighter weight. Anxious to prove the then new cars reliability, the cars were perfectly prepared and finished first, second and third. Lead HDT driver Peter Brock won the event along with co-drivers Matt Phillip and Noel Richards. Brock has cited this event as his career highlight as it was an event in which many motor racing experts throughout Australia, as well as the media, did not believe he would do well in despite his previous rally and rallycross exploits.

With new regulations for Group C Touring car racing introduced by the Confederation of Australian Motor Sport in 1980 which forced teams to use low emission engines, the HDT (by now owned by Brock and with actual support from Holden dealers after Holden had pulled out of racing at the end of 1979) had been secretly testing a VB Commodore as its replacement for the A9X Torana. However, the new regulations also saw to it that the HDT had arguably the only race ready car for the 1980 Australian Touring Car Championship. Peter Brock won the championship in his VB Commodore, winning four of the eight rounds while claiming pole position at each and every round. 1979 ATCC winner Bob Morris also won a round of the championship driving his Craven Mild Racing VB Commodore.

Brock then won the 1980 CRC 300 at Sydney's Amaroo Park circuit before upgrading to the VC Commodore by the Hang Ten 400 at Sandown Raceway. The VB's final placing in an Australian touring car race was a strong third place by Ian "Pete" Geoghegan and Paul Gulson at the 1980 Bathurst 1000 at Bathurst (Brock and Jim Richards won their third straight Bathurst 1000 in their VC Commodore).

The VB is only one of two Commodore models (along with the VN) not to have won the Bathurst 1000.

References

External links 

  Holden VB Commodore crash test. This test was conducted on 9 June 1992 by the Roads & Traffic Authority (RTA) as part of a test series to commission the Crashlab test facility at Rosebery, New South Wales, Australia. The test was of the facility's drive system, not the actual car which had the tail shaft removed,  of sand ballast placed in the footwells and boot and a  ballast dummy placed on the rear seat. This was supposed to represent a worst-case scenario.
 Golden Holdens : VB Commodore (1978–1980)
 Holden Model History – Holden Commodore – VB Series November 1978 – March 1980
 The Commodore Info Page – Holden Commodore – VB Series November 1978 – March 1980
 The Unofficial Holden Commodore Archive – VB Commodore
 The Unofficial Holden Commodore Archive – VB Commodore Specifications
 Unique Cars and Parts: Holden Commodore VB

Cars introduced in 1978
1970s cars
1980s cars
Cars of Australia
VB
Mid-size cars
Rear-wheel-drive vehicles
Sedans
Station wagons